Eli Jakovska (born 16 May 1995) is a Macedonian footballer, who played for  PFC Lokomotiv Stara Zagora in Bulgaria in the 2020–21 season.

Club career 
In 2015, Jakovska played for ŽFK Dragon 2014. She took part at the 2015–16 UEFA Women's Champions League qualifying round – Group 2 matches for ŽFK Dragon 2014. In 2017, she captained ŽFK Istatov 2015, and won the Macedonian Cup.

She then moved to Turkey and signed with the Istanbul-based club Beşiktaş J.K. on November 9, 2017. She left the club after appearing in six matches and scoring three goals. In the 2019-20 Turkish Women's First Football League season, she joined the İzmir-based club Konak Belediyespor.

International career 
Jakovska was a member of the Macedonian U-17 and U-19 teams; she currently plays for the Macedonian national team.

References

External links 
 

1995 births
Living people
People from Probištip
Macedonian women's footballers
Women's association football forwards
ŽFK Spartak Subotica players
North Macedonia women's international footballers
Macedonian expatriate footballers
Macedonian expatriate sportspeople in Serbia
Expatriate women's footballers in Serbia
Macedonian expatriate sportspeople in Turkey
Expatriate women's footballers in Turkey
Beşiktaş J.K. women's football players
Macedonian expatriate sportspeople in Bulgaria
Expatriate footballers in Bulgaria